Adeuomphalus xerente is a species of sea snail, a marine gastropod mollusc unassigned to family in the superfamily Seguenzioidea.

Description
The shell reaches a maximum reported size of 0.74 mm.

Distribution
This species occurs in the Atlantic Ocean off Brazil, found at depths between 1039 m and 1630 m

References

xerente
Gastropods described in 2009